Rhu-endly Aurelio Jean-Carlo Martina (born 25 September 1989), known as Cuco Martina, is a professional footballer who plays for NAC Breda and the Curaçao national team. He plays primarily as a right-back, but can also play as a centre-back or defensive midfielder.

A youth player at Feyenoord, Martina began his senior career with RBC Roosendaal in the Eerste Divisie, followed by two seasons each at Eredivisie clubs RKC Waalwijk and FC Twente. In 2015, he joined Premier League club Southampton, and two years later Everton.

Born and raised in the Netherlands, he represents Curaçao at international level, for whom he is captain. First capped in 2011, he has won the 2017 Caribbean Cup, and he represented the team at the CONCACAF Gold Cup in 2017 and 2019.

Early and personal life
Martina was born in Rotterdam. He grew up in the south of the city with his mother, brothers and sister. Martina did not know his father, and states his elder brother was instead like a father to him. His brother Javier is also a footballer. Derwin Martina is not related to him, despite media reports to the contrary.

Club career

Netherlands
Martina played youth football with Feyenoord. He spent his early senior career with RBC Roosendaal in the Eerste Divisie. In 2011, he joined RKC Waalwijk of the Eredivisie. He played 59 official matches in two seasons in North Brabant, scoring to open a 2–0 home win over N.E.C. on 8 December 2012.

On 30 July 2013, he joined FC Twente on a three-year deal for an undisclosed fee. Martina played 59 games across all competitions for the Enschede club, scoring once: an added-time equaliser in a 2–2 home draw with Feyenoord on 23 February 2014.

Southampton
He signed a two-year contract with English club Southampton on 7 July 2015. An unused substitute in the first leg, Martina made his Southampton debut in their UEFA Europa League third qualifying round second leg away to Vitesse Arnhem, playing the full 90 minutes of a 2–0 win on 6 August. Three days later, he made his league debut as a half-time substitute for fellow new signing Cédric Soares in a 2–2 draw against Newcastle United. Martina became the first-ever Curaçao international to play for Southampton and the second to play in the Premier League after West Bromwich Albion's Shelton Martis in 2009.

On 26 December 2015, on his first start, Martina scored his only goal for the Saints, a long-range strike to open a 4–0 win over Arsenal. He became the first Curaçaoan to score in the Premier League. He was released by Southampton at the end of the 2016–17 season.

Everton
On 17 July 2017, following his release from Southampton, Martina joined fellow Premier League side Everton on a three-year deal, reuniting with his former Saints manager Ronald Koeman. Martina made his league debut for Everton on 12 August, when his club beat Stoke City 1–0 at Goodison Park.

Martina joined Stoke, newly relegated to the EFL Championship, on a loan for the 2018–19 season. He made his debut on 25 August, playing the full 90 minutes in a 2–0 home win over Hull City.

Martina's loan with Stoke was cancelled on 31 January 2019, and he joined Feyenoord on loan for the remainder of the 2018–19 season.

On 25 June 2020 it was announced that Martina would leave the club when his contract expired on 30 June 2020.

Go Ahead Eagles
He signed for Go Ahead Eagles in November 2021.

In January 2023 he signed for NAC Breda.

International career
Martina made his international debut for Curaçao on 9 August 2011, in their first match since the dissolution of the Netherlands Antilles. He played the first half of the 1–0 friendly loss to the Dominican Republic at the Estadio Panamericano in San Cristóbal, before being substituted for Kenny Kunst. He has played in qualifying matches for the 2014 and 2018 World Cups. He served as national team captain.

Martina was part of the Curaçao squad that won the 2017 Caribbean Cup in Martinique, defeating Jamaica 2–1 in the final. He captained the team at the 2017 CONCACAF Gold Cup. On 10 September 2018 he scored his first international goal in a 10–0 home win over Grenada in the CONCACAF Nations League qualifying.

At the 2019 CONCACAF Gold Cup, Martina was again captain and played every game up to a 1–0 loss to hosts the United States in the quarter-finals in Philadelphia.

Career statistics

Club

International

Scores and results list Curaçao's goal tally first.

Honours
Curaçao
Caribbean Cup: 2017
King's Cup: 2019

Individual
CONCACAF Best XI: 2018

References

External links

Profile at evertonfc.com

1989 births
Living people
Footballers from Rotterdam
Dutch footballers
Curaçao footballers
Association football defenders
Feyenoord players
RBC Roosendaal players
RKC Waalwijk players
FC Twente players
Southampton F.C. players
Everton F.C. players
Stoke City F.C. players
Go Ahead Eagles players
Eerste Divisie players
Eredivisie players
Premier League players
English Football League players
Curaçao international footballers
2014 Caribbean Cup players
2017 CONCACAF Gold Cup players
2019 CONCACAF Gold Cup players
Dutch expatriate footballers
Expatriate footballers in England
Dutch expatriate sportspeople in England
Dutch people of Curaçao descent
Jong FC Twente players
NAC Breda players